Years & Years are a British synth-pop band.

Years and Years may also refer to:

 "Years & Years" (song), a 2016 song by Olly Murs
 Years and Years (TV series), a 2019 British television drama series